Sevno is a settlement northeast of Novo Mesto in southeastern Slovenia. The area is part of the traditional region of Lower Carniola and is now included in the Southeast Slovenia Statistical Region.

Name
The name of the settlement was changed from Sevno na Trški gori to Sevno in 1993.

References

External links
Sevno on Geopedia

Populated places in the City Municipality of Novo Mesto